Alicemarie Huber Stotler (May 29, 1942 – June 9, 2014) was a United States district judge of the United States District Court for the Central District of California.

Education and career

Born in Alhambra, California, Stotler, who was of German descent, received a Bachelor of Arts degree from the University of Southern California in 1964 and a Juris Doctor from the USC Gould School of Law in 1967. Stotler was a deputy district attorney of Orange County, California, from 1967 to 1973. She was in private practice in Tustin, California from 1973 to 1976. She was a municipal court judge for the Harbor Judicial District in Newport Beach, California from 1976 to 1978. She was a Justice pro tempore of the Fourth District Court of Appeal, Division Two, in San Bernardino, California in 1977. She was a judge of the Orange County Superior Court from 1978 to 1983. She returned to private practice in Newport Beach from 1983 to 1984.

Federal judicial service

On April 4, 1984, Stotler was nominated by President Ronald Reagan to a seat on the United States District Court for the Central District of California vacated by Judge Robert J. Kelleher. She was confirmed by the United States Senate on May 1, 1984, and received her commission on May 3, 1984. She served as Chief Judge from 2005 to 2009, and assumed senior status on January 5, 2009 until her death on June 9, 2014.

References

Sources
 

1942 births
2014 deaths
American people of German descent
California state court judges
Judges of the United States District Court for the Central District of California
People from Alhambra, California
Superior court judges in the United States
United States district court judges appointed by Ronald Reagan
20th-century American judges
University of Southern California alumni
USC Gould School of Law alumni
20th-century American women judges